Leonard Mesarić (born 10 August 1983) is a Croatian retired footballer who last played for NK Rudeš.

With Dinamo Zagreb he won the 2010 Croatian Supercup which was his first honour of the career. Before joining the Croatian champions, Mesarić played for TŠK Topolovac, Karlovac, Segesta and NK Lokomotiva. He also represented Croatian national team at the under-18 and under-19 levels.

Club career
Mesarić started his career at TŠK Topolovac. The club was competing in the Prva HNL and Mesarić made a total of 11 appearances throughout the season. TŠK Topolovac finished last and was relegated. He continued his career playing for the second and third tier clubs Karlovac and Segesta. He made a total of 33 appearances for Karlovac and scored 3 goals, while for Segesta he played 10 matches. On 21 January 2007 he gets signed by NK Lokomotiva. Mesarić won two consecutive promotions with the new club and the Zagreb club found itself playing in the Prva HNL for the 2009–10 season. In Prva HNL he made 12 appearances and scored 1 goal for Lokomotiva before he was transferred to Dinamo Zagreb on 26 June 2009.

On 27 July 2014, Mesarić signed a one-year contract with Iranian champions Foolad.

Outside football
Mesarić is alumnus of the Faculty of Humanities and Social Sciences in Zagreb, graduating two double major programs, Pedagogy and Information science. He also performs in the theatre and speaks five languages.

Career statistics

Honours
Croatian First League (1): 2010–11
Croatian Cup (1): 2010–11
Croatian Super Cup (1): 2010

References

External links
 
 

1983 births
Living people
Footballers from Zagreb
Association football defenders
Croatian footballers
Croatia youth international footballers
NK TŠK Topolovac players
NK Croatia Sesvete players
NK Karlovac players
HNK Segesta players
NK Istra 1961 players
NK Lokomotiva Zagreb players
GNK Dinamo Zagreb players
Foolad FC players
NK Rudeš players
Croatian Football League players
Persian Gulf Pro League players
First Football League (Croatia) players
Croatian expatriate footballers
Expatriate footballers in Iran
Croatian expatriate sportspeople in Iran